Hungarian Opera Day (Hungarian: A Magyar Opera Napja) is a commemoration of the birth of Hungarian composer Ferenc Erkel (7 November 1810) and the reopening of the Erkel Theatre in Budapest. It was first held on 7 November 2013.

References

External links 
 A Magyar Állami Operaház hivatalos oldala

November observances
Opera festivals
Autumn events in Hungary